Dekel (lit. Palm tree), officially Dekel-Kfar Shitufi (lit. Dekel - Co-operative Village) is a moshav in southern Israel. Located in the Hevel Shalom area of the north-western Negev desert near the Egypt-Gaza Strip-Israel border, it falls under the jurisdiction of Eshkol Regional Council.

History
A Nahal settlement by the name of Dekel was established in the area in 1956, but was abandoned after the Suez Crisis later in the year. A gar'in group by the same name was formed in the Israeli settlement of Yamit in 1979. However, its establishment on the ground was delayed by the Camp David Accords which meant that Israel had to withdraw from Sinai. The moshav was founded in April 1982 by the eponymous Aguda Shitufit (Co-operative Union) with the help of the Jewish Agency.

References

External links
Dekel Negev Information Centre

Moshavim
Agricultural Union
Populated places established in 1982
Gaza envelope
Populated places in Southern District (Israel)
1982 establishments in Israel